Trigonoptera is a genus of longhorn beetles of the subfamily Lamiinae, containing the following species:

 Trigonoptera acuminata Gressitt, 1984
 Trigonoptera albocollaris Gilmour, 1950
 Trigonoptera amboinica Breuning, 1968
 Trigonoptera annulicornis Gressitt, 1984
 Trigonoptera bimaculata Thomson, 1865
 Trigonoptera breuningiana Gilmour, 1950
 Trigonoptera cincta Gressitt, 1984
 Trigonoptera complicata Gressitt, 1984
 Trigonoptera fergussoni Breuning, 1970
 Trigonoptera flavicollis Breuning, 1940
 Trigonoptera flavipicta (Pascoe, 1867)
 Trigonoptera flavoscutellata Breuning, 1939
 Trigonoptera gracilis Aurivillius, 1917
 Trigonoptera grisea Gressitt, 1984
 Trigonoptera guttulata (Gestro, 1876)
 Trigonoptera harlequina Gressitt, 1984
 Trigonoptera humeralis Gressitt, 1984
 Trigonoptera immaculata Gilmour, 1950
 Trigonoptera iriana Gressitt, 1984
 Trigonoptera isabellae Gilmour, 1949
 Trigonoptera japeni Gilmour, 1949
 Trigonoptera laevipunctata Breuning, 1950
 Trigonoptera lateplagiata Breuning, 1940
 Trigonoptera leptura (Gestro, 1876)
 Trigonoptera maculata Perroud, 1855
 Trigonoptera maculifascia Gressitt, 1984
 Trigonoptera margaretae Gilmour, 1949
 Trigonoptera marmorata Aurivillius, 1908
 Trigonoptera montana Gressitt, 1984
 Trigonoptera monticorum Gressitt, 1984
 Trigonoptera muruana Gressitt, 1984
 Trigonoptera muscifluvis Gressitt, 1984
 Trigonoptera neja Gilmour, 1950
 Trigonoptera nervosa (Pascoe, 1867)
 Trigonoptera nigrofasciata Gressitt, 1984
 Trigonoptera nothofagi Gressitt, 1984
 Trigonoptera obscura Gilmour, 1949
 Trigonoptera olivacea Aurivillius, 1908
 Trigonoptera ornata (MacLeay, 1886)
 Trigonoptera paravittata Breuning, 1970
 Trigonoptera perspicax Gressitt, 1984
 Trigonoptera pseudomaculata Breuning, 1939
 Trigonoptera quadrimaculata Nonfried, 1894
 Trigonoptera regina Gressitt, 1984
 Trigonoptera sordida (Pascoe, 1867)
 Trigonoptera spilonota (Gestro, 1876)
 Trigonoptera sulcata Aurivillius, 1924
 Trigonoptera sumbawana Breuning, 1948
 Trigonoptera sumptuosa Gressitt, 1984
 Trigonoptera tesselata (Pascoe, 1867)
 Trigonoptera transversefasciata Gilmour, 1949
 Trigonoptera trikora Gressitt, 1984
 Trigonoptera trobriandensis Breuning, 1948
 Trigonoptera vittata Gestro, 1876
 Trigonoptera woodfordi Gahan, 1888

References

Tmesisternini